Disc Northwest (also DiscNW or Northwest Ultimate Association) is a Seattle-based Ultimate organization with the aim of increasing participation in the sport of Ultimate at all levels. DiscNW is the largest and most active Ultimate organization in the United States, supporting many teams at the club, local, high school, middle school and elementary school levels. Their mission statement is "Serve as a regional resource, promoting growth in the sport of Ultimate and instilling the spirit of sportsmanship at all levels of play."

DiscNW is a registered 501(c)(3) nonprofit, educational organization in the state of Washington. DiscNW has a full-time staff of six, an active board of directors, and more than 250 volunteers.

DiscNW was founded by Joey Gray, Tom George, Mary Lowry, Jordan Dey, Maria Langlais, Mark Friedland, Bill Penrose and Lisa Thomas in 1995 as a nonprofit repository for funds generated by the growing Potlatch tournament. Soon, DiscNW became an umbrella for the spring ultimate league founded by Mark Friedland and others in 1984 and the fall league founded by Mike King. The first independent Juniors ultimate league was started in 1993 by Mary Lowry, Joe Bisignano, Jeff Jorgenson and others. The growth of youth ultimate in the region was rapid: in 2014, the DiscNW Middle School Spring League had over 1000 players on 79 mixed teams.  In spring of 2007 DiscNW inaugurated what is believed to be the world's first elementary school League, with eight teams, and in 2016, the first stand-alone elementary school youth tournament.

Today, DiscNW runs recreational programming for youth and adults, serving more than 9000 players in the greater Puget Sound region annually,  Programs offered include Adult Rec Leagues, Summer Youth Day Camps, Youth school-based and club leagues, youth and adult tournaments, and learn to play and coach development clinics.  DiscNW is committed to reducing traditional barriers to access for underserved populations and offers financial aid for participants in every youth program.  The 2019 Aspen Institute State of Play report highlighted the popularity of youth ultimate in our region, and indicated the sport "has high participation rates across racial, ethnic and socioeconomic groups."  The 2019 State of Play report for Seattle-KingCounty found that "Nontraditional programs and non mainstream sports, like Ultimate frisbee, offer models for positive youth development."

DiscNW tournaments
 Resolutions - mixed team, early January
 Slog In The Bog - mixed team, March
Spring Reign - high school and middle school teams, April
Spring Jam - elementary school teams, May
Sunbreak - mixed team, July 4 weekend
 Men For All Seasons - men's hat, July
 Sea Plastic - beach (5v5), mixed team, late July
Spawnfest - mixed team, August
 Turkey Bowl - mixed hat, November (Thanksgiving weekend)
 Chick Flick - women's hat, December
 Dangle Wrangle - men's hat, December

DiscNW leagues
 Winter Women's League - 16 teams, December–March, women's hat, highly spirited and social
 Winter Team League - 35 mixed teams, December–March, no scorekeeping
Winter Tacoma Indoor and Outdoor Leagues - 8 teams
Youth Winter High School League - 28 mixed teams, December–March
Youth Winter Tacoma High School and Middle School League - free beginner-friendly learning league
 Spring League - 60 mixed teams, March–June, highly competitive
 Spring Verns League - 8 teams, mixed hat, March–June, beginner friendly
Spring Mixed Hat League - 6 teams
Spring Shoreline Women's Hat League - 4 teams
Spring Tacoma Indoor and Outdoor Hat Leagues - 8 teams
Spring Bellingham Hat League - 6 teams
Youth Spring High School Girls League - 30 teams
Youth Spring High School Mixed League - 10 teams
 Youth Spring High School Boys League - 6 teams 
 Youth Spring Middle School League - 65 mixed teams
Youth Spring Elementary School League - 75 mixed teams, fastest growing league
 Summer League - 55 mixed teams, June–August
 Summer Corporate League - 26 mixed 'corporate teams', June–August
 Summer Hat League - 12 mixed hat teams, June–August, beginner friendly
 Summer Mens Hat League - 4 teams, July–August
 Summer Masters Hat League - 8 teams, July–August
 Summer Womens Hat League - 4 teams, June–August
Summer Tacoma Outdoor Leagues - 4 teams
Youth Summer Leagues - 4-8 teams, various age groups, equal gender ratios
 Fall Team League - 60 mixed teams
 Fall Hat League - 16 teams, mildly competitive
Fall Tacoma Indoor and Outdoor Hat Leagues - 8 teams
Fall Tacoma Womens Hat League - 4 teams
Fall Redmond Mens Hat League - 4 teams
Fall Olympia Hat League - 4 teams
Fall Bellingham Hat League - 6 teams
Youth Fall High School Boys League - 50 Teams
Youth Fall Seattle Public School Middle School League - DiscNW supports this SPS program - 75 teams
Youth Fall High School Girls  League - 6 teams

See also
 Seattle Riot (Ultimate)
 Seattle Sockeye

References

External links
 DiscNW official website

Ultimate (sport) organizations